St. Paul's Gallery is a commercial art gallery, the largest in the United Kingdom outside London.  It is in the Jewellery Quarter in Birmingham, England.

The gallery deals in two main fields: original album art the world's largest collection of signed album cover fine art, including signed cover images from The Beatles, Led Zeppelin, Pink Floyd, David Bowie, Queen and fine art (where its holdings include works from Picasso and Dalí to Henry Moore  Bridget Riley).  St Paul's Gallery also hosts a programme of visiting exhibitions.

It was conceived by Symon Bland and opened in February 2003 in former industrial premises near St Paul's Square.

External links

References

Art museums and galleries in Birmingham, West Midlands
Art galleries established in 2003
2003 establishments in England